The Australian Consulate-General in Hong Kong and Macao represents the Commonwealth of Australia in Hong Kong, and is also accredited to Macau.  As Hong Kong was linked to the Commonwealth during British administration, Australia's diplomatic presence was exercised by an Australian Commission, until 1 January 1986, when it was renamed the Australian Consulate-General. From 1946 to 1972, Australia was represented by the Australian Trade Commission.

Due to Hong Kong and Macau having the status of Special Administrative Regions of the People's Republic of China, the Australian Consulate-General in Hong Kong reports directly to the Department of Foreign Affairs and Trade (DFAT) in Canberra, Australia, rather than to or through the Australian Embassy in Beijing.

History
An Australian Trade Commission in Hong Kong was originally signposted by the Australian Government of Joseph Lyons in the early 1930s. On 30 August 1933 the Minister for Commerce, Frederick Stewart, secured Cabinet approval for the establishment of several Trade Commissions in the East, with Batavia and Hong Kong being the most likely locations. However a decision to appoint a commissioner was delayed pending the report of Attorney General and Minister for External Affairs John Latham's fact-finding mission to the Far East, which found a dire need for Australian trade representative to improve mercantile connections in the region. While in Hong Kong, Latham was impressed by the representations from the Australian community there of "the wretched lack of co-ordination in the shipping services from Australia."

However, the Trade Commission was not established until 1946. This served to represent Australian interests in Hong Kong in the absence of a formal diplomatic post. However, the Department of External Affairs had offices within the Trade Commission.

In 1972, the Trade Commission was upgraded and renamed the Australian Commission, which allowed the office to undertake various semi-diplomatic and consular functions. This change meant that the Commission was no longer under the purview of the Department of Trade and Industry and was now the responsibility of the Department of Foreign Affairs.

From 1 January 1986, the Commission was renamed the Consulate-General, bringing it into line with other Australian missions elsewhere, with Penny Wensley as the first Consul-General. By contrast, other Commonwealth countries, such as Singapore, continued to style their missions Commissions until the transfer of sovereignty to the People's Republic of China in 1997.

In August 1996, prior to the transfer of sovereignty, Australian Foreign Minister Alexander Downer, and Chinese Foreign Minister Qian Qichen, signed an agreement on the continuation of Australia's presence in Hong Kong in the form of a Consulate-General after 1 July 1997.

In February 2020, Deputy Consul General Ryan Neelam was made the acting Consul General.

In October 2020, Elizabeth Ward was announced as Australia's new Consul-General to Hong Kong and Macau following visa delays, which was attributed to political tensions between Australia and China. The official residence of the Consul-General at Deep Water Bay was burgled, however nothing was reportedly stolen.

Office-holders

Trade Commissioners, 1946–1972

Senior Trade Commissioners, 2007– present

Commissioners

Consuls-General

See also
 Australia–Hong Kong relations
 U.S. Consulate General, Hong Kong
 British Consulate-General, Hong Kong

References

External links
 Australian Consulate-General, Hong Kong and Macau
 Australian Consulate-General, Hong Kong and Macau 
 

Hong Kong
Australia
Australia–Hong Kong relations